Garech Domnagh Browne (25 June 1939 – 10 March 2018) was an Irish art collector and a notable patron of Irish arts, traditional Irish music in particular. He was often known by the Irish designation of his name, Garech de Brún, or alternatively Garech a Brún, especially in Ireland.

Family
Browne was the eldest of the three sons of the 4th Baron Oranmore and Browne and his second wife, Oonagh, daughter of The Hon. Ernest Guinness, the second son of the 1st Earl of Iveagh. Oonagh was a wealthy heiress to the Guinness fortune and the youngest of the three "Golden Guinness Girls". Garech's father, Lord Oranmore and Browne, had the rare distinction of sitting in the House of Lords for 72 years, until his death at the age of 100 in August 2002, without ever speaking in a debate.

As both his parents were married three times, Garech had two stepmothers and two stepfathers, as well as a number of older half-siblings. His only full brother, The Hon. Tara Browne, was a young London socialite whose death at the age of 21 in a car crash in London's West End helped inspire John Lennon when writing the song "A Day in the Life" with Paul McCartney. Garech was educated at Institut Le Rosey, Switzerland. Although a member of the extended Guinness family, he took no active part in its brewing business.

When in Ireland, Browne lived at Luggala, set deep in the Wicklow Mountains in County Wicklow. The house, which he inherited from his mother, has been variously described as a castle or hunting lodge of large proportions. In 2008, there was a major theft of silver and rare books from Luggala; previously, Browne had appointed as an adviser on the restoration of Luggala the architectural historian "Count" Randal MacDonnell, who called himself "The MacDonnell of the Glens" and formerly "Baron Randal MacDonnell of the Isles", a well-known eccentric fantasist. While MacDonnell was there, Browne noticed "the disappearance from the house of items of Georgian silver and other valuable chattels", resulting in a "blistering row" and MacDonnell's escape from what was called the "silver teapot affair" to Prague.

A 2012 book, Luggala Days, by Robert O'Byrne details both the history of Luggala and of Garech's life.

Browne once stated he would rather have not been born, calling it "frightful to bring anyone into this world".

Traditional Irish music

Browne had been a leading proponent for the revival and preservation of traditional Irish music, through his record label Claddagh Records which he founded with others in 1959. His former home, Woodtown Manor near Dublin, was for many years a welcoming place for Irish poets, writers and musicians. The folk-pop group Clannad made many recordings of their music there.

Garech was instrumental in the formation of the traditional Irish folk group The Chieftains. In 1962, after setting up Claddagh Records, he asked his friend, the famed uileann piper Paddy Moloney, to form a group for a one-off album. Moloney responded with the first line-up for the band, which went on to achieve international commercial success.

He was interviewed at length for the Grace Notes traditional music programme on RTÉ lyric fm on 18 March 2010.

Art patron

Garech was a friend and patron of the artist Francis Bacon, and in January 2017 was featured in the BBC documentary Francis Bacon: A Brush with Violence.

Marriage
In 1981, Browne married HH Princess Harshad Purna Devi Jadeja of Morvi in Bombay (now Mumbai). Purna was the only child of HH Sri Mahendra Sinhji, Maharaja of Morvi (1918-57) and his wife HH The Maharani Sri Vijay Kuverba

Death
Browne died in London, on 10 March 2018, aged 78.

In his will and testament, he bequeathed to the city of Galway the granite remains of a medieval "bow gate." The location of this gate, which had otherwise gone unmentioned by Browne, remained a mystery for over a year following his death. It was discovered on the grounds of the Luggala estate in 2019. According to a Galway historian, the gate may have formed part of the city's defences in the 17th century, and was later removed from the city by Browne's direct ancestor and nobleman of Galway, Lord Oranmore and Browne, when it was probably taken to the Browne family home at Castle MacGarrett, just outside Claremorris in County Mayo. Their mid-1600s ancestor Geoffrey Browne (MP) (d. 1668) may well have bought the gateway from the city. The gate was one of a number of items left to the Irish State by Browne; another item was his collection of carriages.

In 2022 his library of 20,000 books and manuscripts was placed by his family on a long-term loan to the OPW at Farmleigh.

Portraits
Portraits of Garech and photos of Luggala were published by Vanity Fair in January 2008.

A portrait of Browne as a boy, painted at Luggala by Lucian Freud, was sold in March 2019 for €6.7m.

See also
 The Tribes of Galway

References 

1939 births
2018 deaths
Irish socialites
Garech Browne
Alumni of Institut Le Rosey
Younger sons of barons
People from County Dublin
People from County Wicklow